Louis (1364 – 11 December 1418) was the Lord of Piedmont and titular Prince of Achaea from 1402. He was a son of James of Piedmont and Marguerite de Beaujeu (1346–1402).

In 1405, he founded the University of Turin. On 24 January 1403, he married Bona (1388–1432), daughter of Amadeus VII, Count of Savoy, but they never had any children. When he died in 1418, the Piedmont-Achaea cadet branch of the House of Savoy died with him. His titles and estates were inherited by the senior line of the House of Savoy.

References

1364 births
1418 deaths
House of Savoy
Princes of Achaea
14th-century Italian nobility
15th-century Italian nobility
Lords of Piedmont
14th-century people from Savoy
15th-century people from Savoy